Thiago Felix da Silva is a Brazilian weightlifter. He won the gold medal in men's 61kg event at the 2022 South American Games held in Asunción, Paraguay. He also won the silver medal in the men's 61kg event at the 2021 Pan American Weightlifting Championships held in Guayaquil, Ecuador.

He competed in the men's 61kg event at the 2022 World Weightlifting Championships held in Bogotá, Colombia.

Achievements

References

External links 
 

Living people
Year of birth missing (living people)
Place of birth missing (living people)
Brazilian male weightlifters
Pan American Weightlifting Championships medalists
South American Games gold medalists for Brazil
South American Games medalists in weightlifting
Competitors at the 2022 South American Games
21st-century Brazilian people